The Api Etoile, also known as Star Apple, or Star Lady Apple, is an apple cultivar notable for its five prominent knobs giving it the appearance of a star. It falls into the Api family of apple cultivars.

The Api Etoile is a rare cultivar.  It is cultivated at a few specialty orchards.

Characteristics 

The signature characteristic of the Api Etoile is its shape.  The five ovaries of the apple form distinct knobs giving the apple the appearance of a rounded star.  The apple has light green and pink skin.  Its thick and waxy skin protects the flesh from moisture making it keep longer than other apples.

The tree possesses long and slender branches.

History 

The Api Etoile was first described in the 17th century by the Swiss botanist J. Bauhin in  under the name .

After Bauhin's death in 1613 the fruit would be cultivated in Italy and in the early 18th century it was cultivated by the Carthusians of Paris.

References 

French apples
Apple cultivars